Susana "Susie" Mora Chávez (born 26 January 1979) is an American-born Mexican former women's international footballer who played as a defender. She was a member of the Mexico women's national football team for six years.

Born in the United States, Mora qualified to represent Mexico internationally through her parents. She was part of the team at the 1999 FIFA Women's World Cup.

References

1979 births
Living people
Citizens of Mexico through descent
Mexican women's footballers
Mexico women's international footballers
Place of birth missing (living people)
1999 FIFA Women's World Cup players
Women's association football defenders
Sportspeople from Santa Clara, California
American sportspeople of Mexican descent
American women's soccer players
USC Trojans women's soccer players